A mother plant is a plant grown for the purpose of taking cuttings or offsets in order to grow more quantity of the same plant.

References

Horticulture
Plant reproduction